"Pillow Talkin'" is the debut single recorded by Canadian country music artist Tyler Joe Miller. The track was co-written by Kelly Archer, Blake Chaffin, and Brett Tyler. The song was the lead single off Miller's debut extended play Sometimes I Don't, But Sometimes I Do. It was the first ever debut single from an independent artist to hit #1 on the Billboard Canada Country chart.

Background
Miller told the Surrey Now-Leader how he came to record the song: 

The song was sent to radio on Christmas Day in 2019.

Commercial performance
"Pillow Talkin'" reached a peak of #1 on the Billboard Canada Country chart dated May 16, 2020, making Miller the first independently signed artist to land a #1 hit with their debut single in the history of the chart. The song also reached a peak of #70 on the Canadian Hot 100, and was certified Gold by Music Canada. In Australia, it reached a peak of #28 on the TMN Country Hot 50.

Track listings
Digital download – single
 "Pillow Talkin'" – 3:20

Digital download – single
 "Pillow Talkin'" (Acoustic) – 3:13

Charts

Certifications

References

2019 songs
2019 debut singles
Tyler Joe Miller songs
Songs written by Kelly Archer
Song recordings produced by Danick Dupelle